Louise Anne de Simmy Courcy Thompson (born 26 March 1990) is a British reality television personality known primarily for appearing in the E4 reality series Made in Chelsea. In 2015, she appeared in the second series of The Jump where she finished fourth.

Education 
Thompson attended Downe House, before moving on to study Geography at the University of Edinburgh. She graduated in 2013.

Career
In September 2011, Thompson joined the cast of semi-reality television programme Made in Chelsea for the second series following a brief appearance during the first. In December 2014, it was announced that she would be competing in the second series of The Jump where she reached the final finishing in fourth place.

In 2012, Thompson co-founded the fashion business Pocket London. The company initially focused on the manufacture of denim products, however in 2017 switched to activewear.

She released a book, Live Well with Louise in 2018. Thompson runs a fitness website, Live Like Louise, that includes home workout plans and transformation packages. She has twice appeared on the cover of Women's Health, in July 2017 and August 2018.

In September 2018, Thompson apologised after the Advertising Standards Authority criticised her for failing to make it clear that an Instagram story she posted was an advert promoting a beauty brand.

Personal Life
Thompson is in a relationship with fellow former Made In Chelsea cast member, Ryan Libbey. The pair got engaged in Los Angeles in 2018.  In 2021, they welcomed their first child together a son called Leo-Hunter.

In 2018, Thompson was diagnosed with Ulcerative Colitis.

Her brother is fellow Made In Chelsea personality, Sam Thompson.

Filmography

References

Living people
Participants in British reality television series
Place of birth missing (living people)
1990 births
Made in Chelsea